In analytic geometry, the direction cosines (or directional cosines) of a vector are the cosines of the angles between the vector and the three positive coordinate axes. Equivalently, they are the contributions of each component of the basis to a unit vector in that direction.

Three-dimensional Cartesian coordinates 

If v is a Euclidean vector in three-dimensional Euclidean space, R3,

where ex, ey, ez are the standard basis in Cartesian notation, then the direction cosines are

It follows that by squaring each equation and adding the results

Here α, β and γ are the direction cosines and the Cartesian coordinates of the unit vector v/|v|, and a, b and c are the direction angles of the vector v.

The direction angles a, b and c are acute or obtuse angles, i.e., 0 ≤ a ≤ π, 0 ≤ b ≤ π and 0 ≤ c ≤ π, and they denote the angles formed between v and the unit basis vectors, ex, ey and ez.

General meaning
More generally, direction cosine refers to the cosine of the angle between any two vectors.  They are useful for forming direction cosine matrices that express one set of orthonormal basis vectors in terms of another set, or for expressing a known vector in a different basis.

See also

 Cartesian tensor

References

Algebraic geometry
Vectors (mathematics and physics)